Parson's Pleasure in the University Parks at Oxford, England, was a secluded area for male-only nude bathing on the River Cherwell. It was located next to the path on the way to Mesopotamia at the south-east corner of the Parks. The facility closed in 1991 and the area now forms part of the Parks.

History and folklore
Parson's Pleasure was traditionally frequented by dons of the University. Ladies sitting in passing punts were saved from potential embarrassment by being directed to a path that skirted the area behind a high corrugated iron fence. If a pretext was needed, the ladies could be told that the men needed to haul the punt over "the rollers"—a track made of concrete with metal rollers—next to the nearby weir. Women's use of the path declined in later years but the path and the rollers remain.

The title poem of Christopher Morley's 1923 collection Parsons' [sic] Pleasure describes the area as

A greengloom sideloop of the creek,
A sodden place of twilight smell:
Clear dayshine did not often touch
That water; and a mouldy hutch
For the convenience of undressing.
An ancient, far from prepossessing,
Offered uncandid towels (eschewed
     By most).
There men’s white bodies, nude,
Unconscious, comely, gallant, Greek,
Stretched, tingled cool, shone sleek, lived well
In the one patch where sunwarm fell.

In response to this, Morley's friend C. E. Montague wrote that 'considered physically as a bathing place and not as a temple. Parson's Pleasure was mediocre. Slugs in the dressing hutches, no life in the water, no sun to stand in when drying, the chill of a morgue over the whole place on all but the most fervent dog days. And yet a grave part of death's menace is that under the mould we may forget Parson's Pleasure.'

Parson's Pleasure is now only a scene for tales from the folklore of the university. One anecdote has it that a number of dons were sunbathing naked at Parson's Pleasure when a female student floated by in a punt. All but one of the startled dons covered their genitals—Maurice Bowra placed a flannel over his head instead. When asked why he had done so, he replied, "I don’t know about you, gentlemen, but in Oxford, I, at least, am known by my face."

Robert Robinson's Landscape with Dead Dons contains a scene set in Parson's Pleasure. Edmund Crispin's first Gervase Fen novel, 'The Moving Toyshop,' puts the climax of a riotous chase at the entrance to Parson's Pleasure.

Anthony Gibbs's autobiography In My Time (UK, c. 1969) / In My Own Good Time (US, 1970) describes the author's regular visits to Parson's Pleasure, "the most enchanting spot in Oxford", during his time as an undergraduate.  He writes that it was usual for one punt per afternoon to pass, in which two girls "scarlet-faced and staring straight before them, would meander by. They did it on purpose, of course. No one paid them the slightest attention. Absolute disdain was the code of behavior."

In 1996, the Oxford University Beer Appreciation Society commissioned a local brewery to produce a barley wine called "Parson's Pleasure Ale". There also exists a bell-ringing method named Parson's Pleasure Surprise Maximus, which was rung for the first time in September 2010 by a band of ringers composed of former members of the University of Oxford.

A similar area existed nearby for clothed female bathers, named Dame's Delight. This was closed prior to the closure of Parson's Pleasure.

References

External links

 Oxford University Parks: a historical guide
 Parson's Pleasure (c.1944) painting by William Roberts

1991 disestablishments in England
Culture of the University of Oxford
Defunct sports venues in Oxford
Former public baths
History of the University of Oxford
Nude beaches
Parks and open spaces in Oxford
Public baths in the United Kingdom
Swimming venues in England
University of Oxford sites